Mensah Sarbah Hall is a mixed hall of residence at the  University of Ghana.

Etymology
The Hall was named after John Mensah Sarbah a prominent Ghanaian Lawyer.

See also
University of Ghana

References

University of Ghana